"Shine On" is a song by British indie rock band The Kooks and is the second single from their 2008 album Konk. It was released on 7 July 2008. Although debuting at a disappointing #63 in the UK Singles Chart the song has received a lot of airplay becoming a radio hit. The release of "Shine On" has also boosted Konk back into the UK top 40 album chart. Upon the physical release of "Shine On", the single climbed to #25, the band's lowest charting single since "Sofa Song".

"Shine On" was also featured in a Michelob Ultra TV commercial.

Track listings
UK CD
 "Shine On"
 "Luby Loo"

7" Vinyl
 "Shine On"
 "Come On Down"

Digital iTunes EP
 "Shine On"
 "Shine On" (acoustic version from Q101, Chicago)
 "Luby Loo"
 "Come On Down"

Music video
The music video was made available on The Kooks official website and YouTube on 23 May 2008. It features the band playing the song in a small room while water is dripping from the ceiling.

Promotion
On 3 July 2008 The Kooks performed a live session on BBC Radio 1. During Jo Whiley's Live Lounge they played a special version of "Shine On" plus a cover of Coldplay's song "Violet Hill".

The Kooks also played the song live on Graham Norton's TV programme.

The song was played in the John Lewis 'Through The Ages' advert in 2011.

Chart performance

References

2008 singles
The Kooks songs
2008 songs
Virgin Records singles